Statistics of Kuwaiti Premier League for the 1996–97 season.

Overview
It was contested by 13 teams, and Al Arabi Kuwait won the championship.

League standings

Semifinals
Al Arabi Kuwait 3-2 : 0-0 Al Salmiya Club
Kazma Sporting Club 1-1 : 0-3 Al Naser Sporting Club

Third place match
Kazma Sporting Club 1-0 Al Salmiya Club

Final
Al Arabi Kuwait 1-0 Al Naser Sporting Club

References
Kuwait - List of final tables (RSSSF)

1996–97
1
1996–97 in Asian association football leagues